Oleksiy Chernyshov (born 4 September 1977, Kharkiv, Ukrainian SSR, Soviet Union) is a Ukrainian statesman and politician, businessman and investor. He has been CEO at “Naftogaz of Ukraine” NJSC since November 2022, was Minister for Communities and Territories Development in 2020-2022, and Kyiv Region Governor in 2019-2020.

Since the beginning of his political career, he carried out one of the most successful reforms in Ukraine — the decentralization reform, as well as the reform of state regulation in construction.

He has more than 20 years of business experience in the private sector of the economy in Ukraine and abroad. During this period, he was engaged in finance, investment management, investment banking, and worked in real estate and IT.

Early life and education 
Oleksiy Chernyshov was born and grew up in Kharkiv. He graduated from Kharkiv University of Humanities “People’s Ukrainian Academy” in 1999 with a degree in economics, and from Yaroslav Mudryi National Law University with a degree in law in 2002.

Business activity 
In 1998 he continued his career in the IT industry at Telesens, which developed system software for the telecommunication business as a subsidiary of German Telesens AG (Cologne, Germany). In 2002, he and his partners acquired the Ukrainian part of the group, which became an independent company.

In the early 2000s, Chernyshov's interest in commercial real estate and development led to the implementation of several successful projects in Kharkiv, after which cooperation with AVEC Concern began. In 2004 Chernyshov – Vice President of the Development, since November 2005 – President of Concern and AVEC Group. From 2008 to 2013 – Chairman of the Supervisory Board of the Concern and the AVEC Group. Chernyshov forms a portfolio of new commercial real estate projects with a total area of 350,000 m². The businessman attracts significant foreign partners working in FDI (foreign direct investments) in commercial real estate development, including UNIQA Real Estate AG, New Century Holdings (NCH), ECE and others.

Investment activities 
In 2012, he founded an investment and development company Eastgate Development, which activity was focused on the development of large-scale commercial real estate projects, as well as attracting foreign investments in Ukraine and stabilizing the investment climate in the country.

In 2013, Chernyshov initiated the large-scale infrastructure project «Kyiv Business Harbor» where he was also a partner. The idea behind the project was to create an industrial production cluster on the left bank of Kyiv (Troieshchyna) on 330 hectares, which should help to solve such issues as creating additional jobs and changing labor migration indicators between the right and the left banks of the city.

In 2014, Chernyshov founded the investment company «VI2 Partners». The company's offices are based in Kyiv and Vienna. The main activities of VI2 Partners are direct investment, formation and management of the asset portfolio, investment banking - mergers and acquisitions, capital raising, debt restructuring. The company cooperates with international financial institutions.

In 2017, VI2 Partners acquired a stake in the Furshet supermarket chain from the French operator Auchan Group. The amount of the agreement is not disclosed.

Social activity 
In 2014, Oleksiy Chernyshov founded the Kyiv Vision Foundation, an organization is dedicated to attracting investment to the country, supporting cultural projects and promoting Ukraine in Europe through the contemporary Ukrainian art. In the fall of 2014, an exhibition of contemporary Ukrainian art "Through Maidan and Beyond" dedicated to Euromaidan events was successfully held in the Museumsquartier of Vienna (Austria). Among the guests were cultural and artistic figures and politicians, including Austrian Foreign Minister (since 2017 - Austrian Federal Chancellor), Sebastian Kurz. Ukrainian art was presented by works of 23 artists, among them were Boris Mikhailov, Vlada Ralko, Sergey Bratkov, Nikita Kadan, Zhanna Kadyrova and others.

In the same year Chernyshov supported the publication Awesome Kyiv, a modern guide to the Ukrainian capital that opened unknown places to people. The publication was the first in a series of such guides in Kyiv. A few years later with Chernyshov's support, the publishing house Osnova published a new book from the Awesome series about Kharkiv – the industrial and cultural center of Ukraine. The publication of Awesome Kharkiv took place in December 2018.

In November 2017, Chernyshov became a chairman of the Supervisory Board of the Ukrainian Real Estate (URE) Club, a professional organization that brings together local and international experts and practitioners of the Ukrainian real estate market and promotes investment.

In 2018, with the initiative and support of Chernyshov, the School of Commercial Real Estate Management was established. This is the first joint project with URE Club and the International Institute of Management (MIM).

In March 2019, Chernyshov joined the All-Ukrainian Network of Integrity and Compliance (UNIC). The network was started by the Business Ombudsman Council with the support of the European Bank for Reconstruction and Development and the Organization for Economic Cooperation and Development. The purpose of creation is to promote the idea of ethical and responsible business.

Government service 

Chernyshov served as head of the Kyiv Oblast State Administration from 28 October 2019 until 11 March 2020. His tenure focused on decentralization, regional development, improvement of infrastructure and rail service, and the construction of schools, kindergartens, and stadiums. He also sought to increase investment into the region, restoring the activities of Regional Development Agency and convening an Investors Council, which first met in February 2020.

Chernyshov was appointed minister of communities and territories development and confirmed during a special session of the Verkhovna Rada on 4 March 2020. On 1 June 2020, he was also appointed to the National Anticorruption Policy Council. As minister, he focused on regional development, housing and communal services reform, State Architectural and Construction Inspection reform, decentralization, and international cooperation. Chernyshov also helped to oversee the Great Construction, a controversial project announced by President Volodymyr Zelenskyy in 2020 to modernize infrastructure in the country. On 6 October 2020, Chenyshov and European Investment Bank Vice President Teresa Czerwińska signed a €300 million loan to improve energy efficiency in some government-owned buildings. Ukraine's decentralization reform was highlighted as among the most successful in a report on the implementation of the Association Agreement between Ukraine and the European Union, adopted by the European Parliament on 11 February 2021.

On November 3, 2022 Chernyshov was dismissed as Minister for Communities and Territories Development by the Verkhovna Rada. On the same day, the Cabinet of Ministers appointed him as head of the board of Naftogaz.

Family 
Chernyshov is married to Svetlana Chernyshova, an assistant professor at Taras Shevchenko National University of Kyiv. Has two sons (2006 and 2014) and a daughter (2019).

References

External links 

 
 

1977 births
Living people
Politicians from Kharkiv
Yaroslav Mudryi National Law University alumni
Governors of Kyiv Oblast
Independent politicians in Ukraine
Regional development and construction ministers of Ukraine
21st-century Ukrainian businesspeople
21st-century Ukrainian politicians
Businesspeople from Kharkiv